Termon is a village in the north of County Donegal, Ireland.

Geography
Termon is located eight miles from Letterkenny, Donegal's main town and seven miles from Creeslough. Termon is made up of many townlands including Currin, Doon, Drumlaurgagh, Drumbrick, Drumoughill, Cloncarney, Terhillion, Gortnalaragh, Clonkilly, Knocknabollan, Fawans, Drumdeevin, Drumfin, Barnes, Stragraddy, Ballybuninabber, Letterfad, Goal and Gurtin, Loughaskerry.

There are several hills close to Termon, including Lough Salt (469m), the hills of Barnes-Crockmore (the "Resting Bishop") at 324m, 349m & 307m respectively, and Stragraddy mountain (285m). All the hills have views along Donegal's Atlantic coast line or into the higher mountain country of Muckish (666m) and Errigal (749m).

Rivers and Loughs
The Lurgy runs through Termon.(Irish - An Lorgaigh)
Clonkillymore Lough
Clonkillybeg Lough
Doon Lough
Cloncarney Lough
Lough Darragh
Lough Askerry
Lough Mnafin
Lough Acrappin - Top of Drumfin
Lough Acrabane - Barnes Gap

Sport
Termon Gaelic Athletic Association was founded in 1963. All age groups play and train at the local pitch "The Burn Road" The Termon GAA adult team plays in the Donegal Senior Championship. The  Termon minor GAA team were 2019 Donegal minor Champions and were defeated on 1 January 2020 by a  single point by Lavey Derry in the Ulster Minor final in Belfast. Termon LGFA adult team were crowned Tesco Club All-Ireland Champions in 2014, defeating Mournabbey of Cork in the Final. Termon LGFA have won two Ulster Club Championships one in 2010 and one in 2014 beating Donaghmoyne of Monaghan in both finals. The Termon Ladies team were 2019 Donegal champions making them senior county champions for a sixth time they competed in the 2019 Ulster Final being defeated by Donaghmoyne of Monaghan by a single point. Termon currently fields 23  teams at all age groups male and female and schools teams.

Historical sites
Megalithic tomb 1 (Grid.ref C107248) - Barnes townland
Megalithic tomb 2 (Grid.ref C107219) - Gortnalaragh townland, known locally as Dermot and Groinna, 2 stones visible from the Terhillion Rd
Megalithic tomb 3 (Grid Ref C119211) - Drumbrick townland
Standing Stones 1 (Grid ref C108245) -  Barnes townland
Standing Stones 2 (Grid ref C109241) -  Barnes townland (Ogham standing stones) - these are thought to be the original boundaries of 'An Tearmann' denoting sanctuary, as those seeking it were thought to be within the Kilmacrenan Abbey.See local history below-Frank Mc Gettigan
Cillin 1 (Grid ref C109240) - Barnes townland
Cillin 2 (Grid ref C125206) - Clonkilly townland
Ring Fort (Grid ref C121216) - Drumbrick townland, situated at the top of Drumbrick hill, visible from the Burn road

Religious sites
Several sites around Termon are significant to the Roman Catholic faith in Donegal.

Doon Well
Doon Well was established by Lector O'Friel sometime around the 1670s. Doon Well's origins are pre-Christian:
A 'tóchar' (ancient wooden road) runs underneath the bog adjacent to Doon Rock
Bronze Age artefacts have been found near the well
The water used in the inauguration ceremony of the O'Donnells would have been carried from the well. Stations and rosary are still 'walked' from St. Columba's chapel to Doon Well on Hogmanay (New Year's Eve) and May eve.

Mass Rocks
The Mass Rocks were used during penal times (1695–1741). There are thought to be several more in the Termon area and were generally in areas were people could meet, practice their faith and post a look out to warn the congregation. Priests usually said mass under pain of death, if they were caught the priest would find himself put into a barrel of nails and thrown of the cliff near Doon rock at 'Binn an tSagairt' or Hill of the Priest. There is also a mass rock in the Terhillion townland of Termon, Terhillion (Tirkillin) means place of little huts or churchyard. The town land of Fawans has a mass rock which is high up in the townland.

Doon Rock
Doon Rock (120m approx) is the site where 25 O'Donnells were inaugurated chieftain from Eighneachan 1200 to Niall Garbh 1603. Red Hugh O'Donnell was inaugurated on 3 May 1592. Cahir O'Doherty, Lord of Inishowen, was also killed in battle there by Sir Arthur Chichester in 1608, while leading an uprising. This event was a significant influence on the formulation of plans for the plantation of Ulster.

St. Columba's Chapel
Termon is served by St. Columba's Chapel (1854–present). The parish priest is Fr Patrick McHugh.

Ethne's Well
Ethne's Well, in the Barnes townland, is named after Columba's mother. Ethne is strongly associated with the area. This holy well had stations performed on 9 June for nine nights.

St. Glassan
St. Glassan  is a saint of the parish of whom little is known. The "Martyrology of Donegal" gives his feast day as 1 October. The grave of Father Glasán (Frater Cassians) is thought to be in the Stragraddy townland of Termon.

References

Towns and villages in County Donegal